The 1921 SMU Mustangs football team was an American football team that represented Southern Methodist University (SMU) as a member of the Southwest Conference (SWC) during the 1921 college football season. Coach J. Burton Rix resigned after the first two games and Bill Cunningham took over as the interim coach for the remainder of the season. The team compiled an overall record of 1–6–1 record with mark of 0–4–1 in conference play, placing last out of seven teams in the SWC. The Mustangs were outscored by a total of 92 to 15. The team played its home games at Armstrong Field in Dallas.

Schedule

References

SMU
SMU
SMU Mustangs football seasons
SMU Mustangs football